The 1971 Bucknell Bison football team was an American football team that represented Bucknell University as an independent during the 1971 NCAA College Division football season.

In their third year under head coach Fred Prender, the Bison compiled a 5–5 record. Joe DiOrio and John Klenovic were the team captains.

Bucknell played its home games at Memorial Stadium on the university campus in Lewisburg, Pennsylvania.

Schedule

References

Bucknell
Bucknell Bison football seasons
Bucknell Bison football